Hugo Daniel Santos Neto (born 7 March 1997) is a Portuguese professional footballer who plays for Louletano, as a forward. Besides Portugal, he has played in Moldova.

References

External links
Benfica official profile 

National team data

1997 births
Living people
Sportspeople from Braga
Portuguese footballers
Association football forwards
Moldovan Super Liga players
S.C. Braga players 
S.L. Benfica footballers
C.D. Tondela players
FC Zimbru Chișinău players
Portuguese expatriate footballers
Expatriate footballers in Moldova